Guilotes is a genus of east Asian funnel weavers. It was first described by B. Li, Z. Zhao and H. F. Chen in 2018, and it has only been found in Chinese caves. The name is a combination of the Pinyin "Gui" (short for "Guangxi") referring to the Guangxi Zhuang Autonomous Region where it was found, and Notiocoelotes, a closely related genus.

Species
 it contains four species:
G. ludiensis Zhao & S. Q. Li, 2018 (type) – China
G. qingshitanensis Zhao & S. Q. Li, 2018 – China
G. xingpingensis Zhao & S. Q. Li, 2018 – China
G. yandongensis Zhao & S. Q. Li, 2018 – China

See also
 Notiocoelotes
 List of Agelenidae species

References

Agelenidae genera
Spiders of China